Somerset is a county in England.

Somerset may also refer to:

Places

Australia
Somerset College (Australia), a private, non-denominational Christian school located in Mudgeeraba, Gold Coast, Australia
Somerset Region, local government area in South East Queensland
Lake Somerset, in Queensland
Somerset, Queensland
Somerset, Tasmania

Bermuda
Somerset Island, Bermuda
Somerset Village, Bermuda

Canada
Somerset, Calgary, a neighborhood in Calgary, Alberta
Somerset, Kings County, Nova Scotia
Somerset, Lunenburg County, Nova Scotia
Somerset, Manitoba, an unincorporated community in south-central Manitoba
Somerset Aerodrome, located southwest of Somerset, Manitoba
Somerset, Quebec, the original name of Plessisville, Quebec
Somerset Island (Nunavut), a large, uninhabited island
Somerset Ward, a city ward in the city of Ottawa, Ontario

Singapore
Somerset MRT station, an underground station on the North South Line of the Mass Rapid Transit in Singapore

South Africa
Somerset East, a town in the Eastern Cape 
Somerset West, a town in the Western Cape 
Somerset, Mpumalanga, a rural settlement also known by its local name Mahlobyanini
Somerset Hospital (Cape Town), in the Green Point area of Cape Town, South Africa opened in 1864

United States
Somerset, El Dorado County, California
Somerset, Siskiyou County, California
Somerset, Colorado
Somerset, Illinois
Somerset, Indiana
Somerset, Kansas
Somerset, Kentucky
Somerset County, Maine
Somerset, Maryland
Somerset County, Maryland
Somerset, Massachusetts
Somerset Township, Michigan
Somerset Collection, a mall in Troy, Michigan
Somerset Township, Minnesota
Somerset, Nebraska
Somerset, Mercer County, New Jersey
Somerset, New Jersey, in Somerset County
Somerset Airport (New Jersey), a public-use airport in Somerset County, New Jersey, United States
Somerset County, New Jersey
Somerset, New York
Somerset, Ohio
Somerset, Pennsylvania
Somerset County, Pennsylvania
Somerset Township, Somerset County, Pennsylvania
Somerset Township, Washington County, Pennsylvania
Somerset (SEPTA station), a rapid-transit station in Philadelphia, Pennsylvania
Somerset, Texas
Somerset, Vermont
Somerset, Virginia
Somerset (Powhatan, Virginia), a place on the NRHP in Powhatan County, Virginia
Somerset, Washington
Somerset (town), Wisconsin
Somerset, Wisconsin, a village

Ships
SAS Somerset, a 1941 ship of the South African Navy
HMS Somerset (1698), a three-decker 80-gun third rate ship
HMS Somerset (1731), an 80-gun third rate ship of the line of the Royal Navy
HMS Somerset (1748), a 70-gun third-rate ship of the line of the Royal Navy
HMS Somerset (F82), launched in 1994
USS Somerset (1862), a side wheel ferryboat
USS Somerset (AK-212), an Alamosa-class cargo ship launched in January 1945
USS Somerset (LPD-25), a 2012 San Antonio-class amphibious transport dock
USS Somerset (1917), a wooden motorboat of the United States Navy

Other uses
Somerset, is an archaic spelling of somersault, an acrobatic feat
Somerset (TV series), a 1970s spinoff of Another World
Somerset (In Death), a character in the In Death series
Samoset (1590–1653), or Somerset, Native American subordinate chief
Somerset (UK Parliament constituency)
Somerset (European Parliament constituency)
Somerset County Council, the county council of Somerset in the South West of England
Somerset Space Walk, a 1997 trail model of the Solar System, located in Somerset, England
Somerset cannon, type of naval cannon used in the 19th century
Somerset House, 18th century neoclassical building in London
Somerset Patriots, Atlantic League baseball team in Bridgewater, New Jersey
Buick Somerset, automobile produced by General Motors from 1985 to 1987
Somerset Books, UK family-owned publisher of the Blue Guides series of travel books
Somerset Trust Company, American financial company

People with the surname
Anne Somerset (historian) (born 1955), English historian and writer
Anne Somerset, Countess of Northumberland (1538–1596), English noblewoman
Anne Seymour, Duchess of Somerset (1497–1587), wife of Lord Protector Somerset
Lord Arthur Somerset (1780–1816), MP for Monmouthshire
Lord Arthur Somerset (1851–1926), British aristocrat
Arthur Somerset (cricketer) (1855–1937), English first class cricketer. 
Charles Somerset, 1st Earl of Worcester (1460–1526), 1st Earl of Worcester and husband of Elizabeth Browne
Charles Somerset, Marquess of Worcester (1660–1698), eldest son of Henry Somerset, 1st Duke of Beaufort
Charles Somerset, 4th Duke of Beaufort (1709–1756), younger son of Henry Somerset, 2nd Duke of Beaufort
Lord Charles Somerset (1767–1831), General and governor of the Cape Colony, South Africa, from 1814 to 1826
Lord Edward Somerset (1776–1842), British soldier, son of the 5th duke of Beaufort
Edward Somerset, 2nd Marquess of Worcester (1601?–1667), styled Lord Herbert of Ragland, English nobleman, son of Henry Somerset, 1st Marquess of Worcester 
Edward Somerset, 4th Earl of Worcester (bef. died 1628), English aristocrat, adviser to James I, serving as Lord Privy Seal
FitzRoy Somerset, 1st Baron Raglan (1788–1855)
Henry Somerset, 9th Duke of Beaufort (1847–1924), between 1853 and 1899, was a British peer
James Somersett, slave who was party to the Somersett's Case of 1772, which abolished slavery in England

People with the given name
W. Somerset Maugham (1874–1965), English author
Somerset Maxwell, 8th Baron Farnham (1803–1884), MP for Cavan
Somerset Maxwell, 10th Baron Farnham (1849–1900), Irish Representative peer
Somerset Arthur Maxwell (1905–1942), MP for King's Lynn

See also
Somersault, an acrobatic feat
Somerset Hospital (disambiguation)
Somerset Mall (disambiguation)
Duchess of Somerset (disambiguation)
Duke of Somerset, a title in the English peerage
Lord Somerset (disambiguation)
Summerset (disambiguation)